Chris Nelloms (born August 14, 1971) is an American male former track and field sprinter who specialized in the 200- and 400-meter dash.

Early life
Nelloms attended Dunbar High School in Dayton and set several high school records. He originally competed in both sprints and hurdling and a national high school record of 13.30 seconds for the 110-meter hurdles in 1990 led him to be chosen as Track & Field News''' High School Athlete of the Year.

Career
With a relay gold at the 1988 World Junior Championships in Athletics and three sprint golds at the 1990 World Junior Championships in Athletics, Nelloms has won the most titles in the history of the IAAF World Junior Championships. He also won a gold medal triple at the 1989 Pan American Junior Athletics Championships, topping the podium in the 400 m, 4 × 100-meter relay and 4 × 400-meter relay.

In August 1992 he was shot in the back in a park in Dayton, Ohio, where he had been completing a fitness run. The shot hit an artery, broke his collarbone and punctured a lung, yet he managed to return to good health and race again. No one was charged with the shooting.

He won back-to-back 200 m titles at the NCAA Men's Division I Indoor Track and Field Championships in 1992 to 1993. At the 1993 NCAA Division I Outdoor Track and Field Championships he won the 200 m and 4 × 400 m relay titles, as well as taking a bronze in the 4 × 100 m relay. As a result, he was named the Ohio State Buckeyes male athlete of the year – only the third track athlete to win that title after Olympic medalists Butch Reynolds and Joe Greene. He took a 200 m silver medal at the 1993 Summer Universiade the following month, finishing behind his teammate Brian Bridgewater.

Nelloms took his first national title at the USA Indoor Track and Field Championships in 1994, winning the 200 m race. He ranked second in the world on time for that indoor season behind Olympic champion Linford Christie.

Rape conviction and imprisonment
On January 8, 1999, Nelloms was convicted of one count of felonious sexual penetration and seven counts of rape against his daughter, who had accused him of sexually abusing her in Ohio and Kentucky from 1995 to 1997, when she was between the ages of eight and 11. He was sentenced to four consecutive terms of life in prison. He is incarcerated at Warren Correctional Institution.

Immediately following his trial, Nelloms appealed the conviction, arguing juror and prosecutorial misconduct; the appeal was denied. In February 1999, he appealed again to the Ohio Court of Appeals, arguing for a new trial on the grounds that the state of Ohio only had jurisdiction to judge incidents that occurred in Ohio, not others that occurred in Kentucky. The court ruled that four counts of the indictment be dismissed, but denied Nelloms a new trial. Nelloms appealed again to the State Supreme Court, which rejected it. The case was remanded to the trial court, which rejected the appeal in June 2001.

A prison interview with Nelloms was published in the Dayton Daily News'' in 2006, in which he proclaimed his innocence. In response the victim, Terria Pitts, decided to waive her anonymity and challenge her father, saying: "I wanted to let the public know that Chris Nelloms is not innocent...he's being incarcerated for something he did do. There was evidence. I just want people to know that I'm not a liar."

Personal records
100-meter dash – 10.33 (1992)
200-meter dash – 20.23 (1993)
300-meter dash – 32.38 (1993)
400-meter dash – 45.36 (1990)

International competitions

National titles
USA Indoor Track and Field Championships
200 m: 1994
NCAA Men's Division I Outdoor Track and Field Championships
200 m: 1993
4 × 400 m relay: 1993
NCAA Men's Division I Indoor Track and Field Championships
200 m: 1992, 1993

References

External links



1971 births
Living people
Track and field athletes from Ohio
People from Dayton, Ohio
American male sprinters
American male hurdlers
American shooting survivors
African-American male track and field athletes
Ohio State Buckeyes men's track and field athletes
Universiade medalists in athletics (track and field)
American people convicted of rape
American people convicted of child sexual abuse
Prisoners sentenced to life imprisonment by Ohio
Universiade silver medalists for the United States
Medalists at the 1993 Summer Universiade
21st-century African-American sportspeople
20th-century African-American sportspeople